Recessional may refer to:
Recessional hymn
Recessional (novel), a novel by James A. Michener, published in 1994
"Recessional" (poem), a poem by Rudyard Kipling
"Recessional", a song by Vienna Teng